Pseuderanthemum maculatum, commonly known as yellow-vein eranthemum or golden pseuderanthemum, is a species of evergreen shrub in the family Acanthaceae. It is native to the Solomon Islands and Vanuatu, and has been introduced to other islands of Oceania and to some parts of Southeast Asia, Africa, Central America and South America.

Description
This species has green-veined creamy yellow leaves. The small, white flowers have purple-pink spots that are concentrated at the base of the petals.

Gallery

References

maculatum